The Wanton–Lyman–Hazard House is the oldest surviving house in Newport, Rhode Island, United States. Built , it is also one of the oldest surviving houses in the state. It is located at the corner of Broadway and Stone Street, in the downtown section of the city in the Newport Historic District.

The house "was damaged by Stamp Act riots in 1765 when occupied by a Tory Stampmaster."

The house has passed through several owners since its construction, and has been renovated and improved by some of them. The three for whom it is named were not the first, but they were members of a family, related by marriage that owned it for over a century, from shortly before the Revolution to 1911. Since the 1920s it has been owned by the Newport Historical Society (NHS), which renovated it and converted it to a historic house museum. In 1960 it was among the first National Historic Landmarks designated by the Department of the Interior.

Building

Today the house is a five-bay wooden clapboard structure with a high peaked roof that slopes down in the rear and plaster cornice. It is painted a historic shade of dark red, except for a white door and entryway with pilasters and a small pediment.

History

Stephen Mumford, a Sabbatarian and merchant, built the house in the late 17th century as a simple two-story structure with one room on either side of a central chimney. His son sold it to Richard Ward, a lawyer and governor of Rhode Island, in the early 18th century. Sometime before 1725, a lean-to-styled kitchen was built on the north side of the house.

Martin Howard, Jr., a lawyer and Loyalist (Tory) owned the house afterwards. He decorated the house with molding and panelling inside. He fled in 1766 following the Stamp Act Riots, during which he was hanged in effigy as a reaction to his co-authorship of a pamphlet criticizing the opponents of the Act for their disrespect to the Crown and Parliament. The house was slightly damaged by an angry mob.

A Quaker merchant, John Wanton, bought the house at auction later that year. In 1782 his son-in-law Daniel Lyman, a Revolutionary major, inherited it. Three years later he added the rear wing to accommodate his growing family. From him it passed to Benjamin Hazard, who had married another of Wanton's daughters in 1807. The Hazard family sold the property in 1911, after Mary Hazard, Benjamin's last surviving daughter, died. The building then fell into disrepair and remained vacant.

In 1927, the Newport Historical Society purchased it and renovated it with the help of colonial architectural renovationist and historian, Norman Isham. He and the Society chose to renovate it in a combination of several of the period styles it had passed through. That resulted in removing the rear wing and restoring the upstairs bedroom to its original appearance.

The house was declared a National Historic Landmark in 1960.

In 1995, a Preliminary Historic Structure Report was done, allowing the historical society to get grants for another renovation and stabilization. The four-year project was finished in 2001. During that time, the NHS had also agreed to work with the Newport Garden Club to restore the original grounds and plantings. Archeological research conducted on the property for that project has led to some newer revelations about the house. Among them was an interior and exterior paint analysis, which has led to the house's paint scheme being adjusted. In 2005 a dendrochronology survey of the tree rings in the building confirmed a 1696 construction date.

Gallery

See also

List of National Historic Landmarks in Rhode Island
National Register of Historic Places listings in Newport County, Rhode Island

References

External links
 

Houses on the National Register of Historic Places in Rhode Island
National Historic Landmarks in Rhode Island
Georgian architecture in Rhode Island
Houses completed in 1697
Archaeological sites in Rhode Island
Museums in Newport, Rhode Island
Historical society museums in Rhode Island
Historic house museums in Rhode Island
Houses in Newport County, Rhode Island
Historic American Buildings Survey in Rhode Island
National Register of Historic Places in Newport, Rhode Island
Historic district contributing properties in Rhode Island
1697 establishments in Rhode Island
Hazard family of Rhode Island